Love or Physical is an album by the American musical duo Ashford & Simpson, released in 1989. The first single was "I'll Be There for You". The duo would not record another album until 1996's collaboration with Maya Angelou, Been Found.

The album peaked at No. 135 on the Billboard 200.

Production
The title track was originally called "Honest to Goodness Love"; it in part alludes to AIDS and infidelity.

Critical reception

The Los Angeles Times wrote that "In Your Arms" "is the loveliest and most genuinely sensual ballad this husband-and-wife duo has recorded in a long time." The St. Louis Post-Dispatch noted that "their sound is impeccably produced but actually quite sparse in spots."

The Advocate stated that "the title track is a fresh urban-contemporary approach to male-female relationships." USA Today concluded that the album "goes beyond carnal concerns and explores deeper matters." The Dallas Morning News concluded that "it's still a pleasure to listen when the vocal interplay between these two veterans turns dexterous, as it does on the romantic ballad 'I'll Be There for You'."

Track listing

References

Ashford & Simpson albums
1989 albums
Capitol Records albums